Heart of Midlothian F.C. played their first official match in competitive European football on 3 September 1958. This made the club only the third Scottish and fifth British team to compete in Europe at the time. Hearts have been beaten on two occasions by the club who would go on to win the competition and have also lost twice to the eventual runners–up.

Hearts' best showing in European competition was in the 1988–89 UEFA Cup, where they reached the quarter–finals and narrowly lost 2–1 on aggregate to German giants Bayern Munich. Since then, Hearts became both the first–ever Scottish club and the first–ever British club to reach the new group stage format of the 2004–05 UEFA Cup (now the UEFA Europa League). They also qualified for the 2006–07 UEFA Champions League, becoming the first non Old Firm team in Scotland to do so since the tournament changed from the European Cup to the Champions League.

The club has an unfortunate record of having never progressed through a tie which has finished level on aggregate after two legs. They lost play–off matches by a single goal to Lausanne–Sport in the 1963–64 Inter-Cities Fairs Cup and to eventual runners–up Real Zaragoza in the 1965–66 Inter-Cities Fairs Cup, and they lost due to the away goals rule against Dukla Prague, Red Star Belgrade and Stuttgart in the 1986–87 UEFA Cup, 1996–97 UEFA Cup Winners' Cup, and 2000–01 UEFA Cup respectively.

Steven Pressley and Henry Smith jointly hold the record for playing in the most European matches for Hearts with 22 appearances each, and John Robertson is the club's top scorer with seven goals.

Statistics

Results

Note: In all cases the Hearts score is listed first.

By Competition

Most Appearances

Top Goalscorers

Notes

References

Europe
Heart of Midlothian